The Conversion of Saint Paul is a painting by Peter Paul Rubens, now in the Courtauld Gallery in London. It shows the conversion of Saint Paul and was produced between 1610 and 1612. Between around 1612 and 1614, The Defeat of Sennacherib was produced by the artist as a pendant to it.

Other versions
Rubens produced works on the subject on at least two other occasions - once alone in the 1620s (now lost) and once with his studio at an unknown date (now in the Rubenshuis in Antwerp).

References

1612 paintings
Paintings by Peter Paul Rubens
Paintings in the collection of the Courtauld Institute of Art
Paintings depicting Jesus
Rubens